Robert Chideka (born 1 May 1956) is a Botswana long-distance runner. He competed in the men's 5000 metres at the 1980 Summer Olympics.

References

External links
 

1956 births
Living people
Athletes (track and field) at the 1980 Summer Olympics
Botswana male long-distance runners
Olympic athletes of Botswana
Place of birth missing (living people)